Anzab-e Olya (also Romanized as Anzāb-e ‘Olyā; also known as Āb, Anzāb, and Anzāb-e Bālā) is a village in Kalkharan Rural District, in the Central District of Ardabil County, Ardabil Province, Iran. In the 2006 census, its population was recorded at 1,581, in 366 families.

References 

Towns and villages in Ardabil County